Georgetown is a town in Copiah County, Mississippi, United States. The population was 286 at the 2010 census. With its eastern border formed by the Pearl River, it is part of the Jackson Metropolitan Statistical Area.

Two sites near Georgetown are listed on the National Register of Historic Places: the Highway 28 bridge over the Pearl River, about a mile east of Georgetown, and the Alford-Little House, off Highway 27 south of town.

Geography
Mississippi Highway 28 leads west  to Hazlehurst, the county seat, and east  to Magee. Mississippi Highway 27 crosses Highway 28 on the northern edge of town and leads northwest  to Crystal Springs and south  to Monticello.

Demographics

As of the census of 2000, there were 344 people, 135 households, and 88 families residing in the town. The population density was 513.2 people per square mile (198.2/km2). There were 152 housing units at an average density of 226.8 per square mile (87.6/km2). The racial makeup of the town was 68.02% White, 29.94% African American, 0.87% from other races, and 1.16% from two or more races. Hispanic or Latino of any race were 1.74% of the population.

There were 135 households, out of which 34.1% had children under the age of 18 living with them, 40.7% were married couples living together, 19.3% had a female householder with no husband present, and 34.1% were non-families. 33.3% of all households were made up of individuals, and 10.4% had someone living alone who was 65 years of age or older. The average household size was 2.55 and the average family size was 3.27.

In the town, the population was spread out, with 29.9% under the age of 18, 8.1% from 18 to 24, 29.7% from 25 to 44, 20.9% from 45 to 64, and 11.3% who were 65 years of age or older. The median age was 35 years. For every 100 females, there were 90.1 males. For every 100 females age 18 and over, there were 81.2 males.

The median income for a household in the town was $25,781, and the median income for a family was $31,000. Males had a median income of $28,958 versus $20,313 for females. The per capita income for the town was $17,919. About 19.3% of families and 22.4% of the population were below the poverty line, including 26.0% of those under age 18 and 31.8% of those age 65 or over.

Education
Georgetown is served by the Copiah County School District.

The Copiah-Jefferson Regional Library operates a branch in Georgetown.

Notable people
 Dick Bass, former American football running back who played for the Los Angeles Rams from 1960 to 1969
 David Catchings Dickson, former Speaker of the Texas House of Representatives and fourth Lieutenant Governor of Texas
 Troy H. Middleton, U.S. Army Lieutenant general and former president of Louisiana State University

References

External links
 
 City-Data.com: Georgetown, Mississippi

Towns in Copiah County, Mississippi
Towns in Mississippi
Jackson metropolitan area, Mississippi